Jonathan Paredes Bernal (born 14 August 1989) is a Mexican high diver who won the bronze medal at the 2013 World Aquatics Championships in Barcelona at the high diving event behind Orlando Duque and Gary Hunt.

Notes

References

External links
 

1989 births
Living people
Divers from Mexico City
Mexican male divers
Male high divers
World Aquatics Championships medalists in high diving
21st-century Mexican people
20th-century Mexican people